Agnello is an Italian surname literally meaning "lamb". Notable people with the surname include:

 Bruno Agnello (born 1985), Brazilian football (soccer) midfielder
 Carmine Agnello (born 1960), New York mobster
 Carmine Gotti Agnello (born 1986)
 Chris Agnello (born 1968), American soccer coach
 Frank Gotti Agnello (born 1990)
 Giovanni Battista Agnello, author and alchemist
 John Gotti Agnello (born 1987)
 Louis "Cousin Vinny" Agnello
 Vincenzo Agnello Suardi (1582–1644), Roman Catholic prelate who served as Bishop of Mantua and Alba

See also 
Agnelli 

Italian-language surnames